Rajagopalaswamy Temple is a Hindu temple dedicated to Vishnu located at Kumbakonam in Thanjavur district, Tamil Nadu, India.

Presiding deity
The moolavar presiding deity, is found in his manifestation as Rajagopalaswamy. His consort is known as Sengamalavalli.

There is another temple in the same name at Thoppu Street in Kumbakonam.

Specialty
Five Vishnu temples are connected with Mahamaham festival which happens once in 12 years in Kumbakonam. They are:
Sarangapani Temple, 
Chakrapani Temple, 
Ramaswamy Temple, 
Rajagopalaswamy Temple, and 
Varahaperumal Temple. 
This temple, one among them, is situated in the north of Big Street.

Garudasevai
Garudasevai is one of the main festivals of the temple.

Mahasamprokshanam
The Mahasamprokshanam also known as Kumbabishegam of the temple was held on 19 June 2015.

The temple after Mahasamprokshnam (19 June 2015)

See also
 Mahamaham
 Mahamaham tank, Kumbakonam
 Hindu temples of Kumbakonam

References 

Hindu temples in Kumbakonam
Vishnu temples